The women's team table tennis event at the 2011 Summer Universiade was held from August 13 to August 16 at the Shenzhen Bay Sport Center Gym in Shenzhen, China. The teams played in pools in a round robin preliminary round, and the top teams from each pool advanced to the playoffs.

Medals

Round robin

Group A

Group B

Group C

Group D

Playoffs

References
Round Robin Final Results & Playoff Draw

Table tennis at the 2011 Summer Universiade